4M or 4-M may refer to:

4m, or 4 metres
4-meter band in amateur radio
4M, a model of Toyota M engine
4M, a model of Mitsubishi 4M4 engine
4M, a model of HP LaserJet 4
DC-4M, a designation of Canadair North Star
A-4M, a model of Douglas A-4 Skyhawk
Fokker DH-4M, see Airco DH.4
VF-4M, see VMA-211
VB-4M, see VMFA-232
PB-4M, see Osa (handgun)
Sun-4m, a model of Sun-4 workstation
Mayall 4m telescope, see Nicholas U. Mayall Telescope
Meade 4M Community, an astronomy awareness community sponsored by Meade Instruments
LATAM Argentina, a defunct airline based in Buenos Aires, Argentina
J-4M, see  Barnett J4B
4M of manufacture industries are Man, Money, Material and Machine. Also see resource management and Ishikawa diagram.
4M Software applications for Engineers, see IDEA Architectural and FINE MEP
4M, Manfred Memorial Moon Mission, first commercial moon mission
4M, the production code for the 1976 Doctor Who serial The Masque of Mandragora

See also
M4 (disambiguation)